Lawrence Cunningham (born 23 October 1965) is a Jamaican cricketer. He played in two first-class and four List A matches for the Jamaican cricket team from 1985 to 2001.

See also
 List of Jamaican representative cricketers

References

External links
 

1965 births
Living people
Jamaican cricketers
Jamaica cricketers
People from Montego Bay